Ecole du XIII St Pierrais are a French Rugby league club based in Saint-Pierre, Haute-Garonne in the Midi-Pyrénées region. Founded in 1981. The club plays in the Midi-Pyrénées League in the French National Division 2. The club runs both junior and ladies teams.

See also 

National Division 2

External links 

 

1981 establishments in France
French rugby league teams
Rugby clubs established in 1981